The University of Akron: School of Music is an academic program for music content at the University of Akron. Some groups that perform there are: a Wind Symphony, a Symphony Band, and more.

Performing groups
 Wind Symphony
 Symphony Band
 Concert Band
 Marching Band "Ohio's Pride" ~250 members 
 Pep Band "Blue and Gold"
 Steel Drum Band
 The Akron New Music Ensemble
 Jazz Combo(s) and Ensemble(s)
 Symphony Orchestra
 Concert Choir 
 Chamber Choir
 Chamber ensembles

Ensembles are open to music majors and non-majors.

Facilities

Facilities include a 250-seat recital hall, the 2,895-seat Edwin J. Thomas Performing Arts Hall, a music computer center, a music resource center, and an electronic music composition laboratory. Guzzetta Hall, home of the School of Music, combines with the Edwin J. Thomas Performing Arts Hall to form a center for the performing arts. The Nola Guzzetta Recital Hall is equipped with a three manual Moeller pipe organ, a Martin harpsichord, and two Steinway concert grand pianos.

Notable alumni
Mark Scatterday - director of the Eastman Wind Ensemble
Daniel W. McCarthy - Composer and Co-Author

References

Music schools in Ohio
University of Akron